Taghavior Taqavi (related to the Arabic and Persian term تقوا with the meaning of piety or virtue) is a Persian language surname which in both of its Latin transcriptions (Taghavi and Taqavi) of the Perso-Arabic alphabet is also common among the Iranian diaspora.

Notable people with the surname include:

 Ahmad Taghavi (born 1978), Iranian footballer
 Hamid Taqavi (1955–2014), Brigadier General in the Iranian Army of the Guardians of the Islamic Revolution
 Mehdi Taghavi (born 1987), Iranian wrestler
 Mohammad Taghavi (born 1967), retired Iranian football player
 Mojtaba Taghavi (born 1968), retired Iranian football player
 Shahram Taghavi (born 1989), English lawyer

Persian-language surnames